GPRD may refer to:

 General Practice Research Database, a large United Kingdom medical record database from 1994 to 2012
 Greater Pearl River Delta, a major Chinese economic region

See also
 General Data Protection Regulation (GDPR), an EU regulation